Aleksandar Sovkovski (born January 24, 1981) is a Macedonian former professional basketball player who last played for Vodnjanski Lisici.

References

External links
 http://www.proballers.com/basket-ball-player/50725/aleksandar-sovkovski/career-stats 
 Aleksandar Sovkovski Player Profile, Vodwanski Lisici Skopje, News, Stats - Eurobasket 
 Aleksandar Sovkovski

1981 births
Living people
KB Peja players
KK MZT Skopje players
Macedonian men's basketball players
Sportspeople from Skopje
KK Vardar players
Small forwards
Shooting guards